Deep Blue may refer to:

Film 
 Deep Blues: A Musical Pilgrimage to the Crossroads, a 1992 documentary film about Mississippi Delta blues music
 Deep Blue (2001 film), a film by Dwight H. Little
 Deep Blue (2003 film), a film using footage from The Blue Planet

Music 
 Deep Blue (musician), electronic and drum and bass musician
 Deep Blue Organ Trio, a Chicago-based jazz organ trio

Albums
 Deep Blue (Louise Patricia Crane album), 2020
 Deep Blue (Parkway Drive album) (2010)
Deep Blue (Mark Peters and Elliot Ireland album) (2015)
 Deep Blue (Peter Mulvey album) (1997)
 Deep Blue: Chaos from Darkism, a 2006 album by Balzac
 Deep Blue: Chaos from Darkism II, a 2006 album by Balzac
 The Deep Blue, a 2007 album by Charlotte Hatherley
 Deep Blue, a 2001 album by Keiko Matsui

Songs
 "Deep Blue" (song), a song by George Harrison
 "Deep Blue", a song by Ladytron from Velocifero
 "Deep Blue", a song by Angra from Holy Land
 "Deep Blue", a song by Arcade Fire from The Suburbs
 "Deep Blue", a song by Louise Patricia Crane from Deep Blue

Other uses 
 Deep Blue (chess computer), a chess-playing computer developed by IBM that defeated world champion Garry Kasparov in 1997
 Deep Blue (comics), a superhero in the post-Crisis DC Universe
 Deep Blue (novel), a novel based on Doctor Who
 Deep Blue (video game), a 1989 underwater shooter video game
 Deep Blue (Tokyo Mew Mew), a character from Tokyo Mew Mew
 Deep Blue, an institutional repository of the University of Michigan Library

See also
 Deep Blue Sea (disambiguation)
 Deep Blue Something, an American rock band
 Shades of blue